Sergio Camello Pérez (born 10 February 2001) is a Spanish professional footballer who plays as a forward for Rayo Vallecano, on loan from Atlético Madrid.

Club career
Born in Madrid, Camello joined Atlético Madrid's youth setup in 2009, aged eight, from CDS Las Encinas de Boadilla. He made his senior debut with the reserves on 23 September 2018, coming on as a second-half substitute and scoring the equalizer in a 4–2 Segunda División B away win against CDA Navalcarnero.

On 12 May 2019, Camello scored a brace in a 2–0 away defeat of Pontevedra CF. He made his first team – and La Liga – debut six days later; after coming on as a half-time substitute for Thomas Partey, he scored the equalizer in a 2–2 away draw against Levante UD, becoming the first player born in the 21st century to score for Atleti.

On 31 August 2021, Camello moved to Segunda División side CD Mirandés on loan for the 2021–22 season. An undisputed starter, he scored 15 goals during the campaign, notably scoring braces against UD Las Palmas (4–2 win), CD Lugo (3–2 win) and SD Ponferradina (3–1 win).

On 3 August 2022, Camello renewed his contract with Atleti until 2026, and moved to fellow top tier Rayo Vallecano on loan for the season.

Career statistics

Club

References

External links

2001 births
Living people
Footballers from Madrid
Spanish footballers
Association football forwards
La Liga players
Segunda División players
Segunda División B players
Atlético Madrid B players
Atlético Madrid footballers
CD Mirandés footballers
Rayo Vallecano players
Spain youth international footballers
Spain under-21 international footballers